Jessica Harrison may refer to:

 Jessica Harrison (triathlete) (born 1977), British-born French triathlete
 Jessica Harrison (Casualty), a character on the medical drama Casualty